Spencer Elliot Livermore, Baron Livermore (born 12 June 1975) is a strategy and communications professional. He currently works in the European Banking Practice at the global consulting firm McKinsey & Company, as a Proposal Strategist. He was previously Director of Strategy at communications consultancy Teneo Blue Rubicon - where he built and had Board responsibility for their Strategic Consulting division. Before that he was Senior Strategist at advertising agency Saatchi & Saatchi.

Prior to working in business, he served in government for ten years, working for Gordon Brown from 1997 to 2008, first as chief strategy adviser to the Chancellor of the Exchequer in the Treasury, and then as director of strategy to the prime minister in 10 Downing Street.

He also served as a senior adviser on four General Election campaigns: 1997, 2001, 2005, and 2015, with The Guardian describing him as one of the most experienced election campaigners in the Labour Party. Philip Gould described him in The Unfinished Revolution as one of seven people who devised the strategy for the election-winning 2001 and 2005 general election campaigns.

On 21 October 2015 he was created a life peer, taking the title Baron Livermore, of Rotherhithe in the London Borough of Southwark. He served on the Lords Economic Affairs Select Committee from 2016 to 2019. He has been on leave of absence from the House of Lords since July 2020 but is still entitled to use his title.

From 2016 to 2020, he was a Visiting Senior Fellow in Communications at the London School of Economics.

Early life 
Livermore grew up in Wickford, Essex and attended Beauchamps High School and Basildon College, before taking a BSc (Econ) at the London School of Economics, graduating in 1996.

Career
After graduating from LSE, Livermore worked for Gordon Brown, then Labour's Shadow Chancellor, during the 1997 general election campaign in which the Labour Party under the leadership of Tony Blair returned to power following 18 years in opposition to the Conservative Party.  After the campaign he was appointed a Special Adviser in the Treasury, working as a key political aide to Gordon Brown, who was then Chancellor of the Exchequer.

In the run-up to the 2001 general election, at the request of the Chancellor, who was Chair of Strategy for the election campaign, Livermore went to work alongside the General Election co-ordinator Douglas Alexander, Member of Parliament, at the Labour Party's Millbank Tower headquarters, helping to run the campaign as Director of Research.  When he returned to the Treasury after the 2001 general election, Livermore was appointed as Special Adviser to the Chancellor of the Exchequer.

Livermore helped run the 2005 general election campaign, acting as Brown's campaign strategist, and working closely with Philip Gould, after which Livermore was appointed as the most senior of Brown's advisers, as Chief Strategy Adviser to the Chancellor of the Exchequer. During this time, Livermore also worked on a number of US congressional campaigns.

It was subsequently reported that as Chief Strategy Adviser to the Chancellor, Livermore opposed the abolition of the 10p rate of income tax in the 2007 Budget, but was over-ruled by the Chancellor.

Following Tony Blair's resignation as Prime Minister on 27 June 2007, Gordon Brown, as the new Leader of the Labour Party, became Prime Minister. Gordon Brown appointed Livermore to 10 Downing Street as Director of Strategy, attending Cabinet meetings and with responsibility for strategic planning.  He devised the strategy for Gordon Brown's leadership transition in 2007 and Brown's subsequent first 100 days.

In November 2007 Gay Times described him as the "most powerful" gay man in Britain. In December 2007, Pink News listed him as the most powerful gay person in British politics.
Livermore was the first of Gordon Brown's advisers to advocate holding an early General Election in the autumn of 2007, writing the initial strategy memo to the Prime Minister setting out this course of action.

After Gordon Brown failed to call a General Election, Livermore left Downing Street in 2008 and joined advertising agency Saatchi & Saatchi as Senior Strategist. He was the first of Gordon Brown's senior advisers to leave Downing Street, and was replaced in Number 10 by David Muir from WPP.

In September 2009 it was reported that Livermore had been asked by Peter Mandelson to return to Downing Street as Chief of Staff, and by Gordon Brown to run the planning of Labour's election campaign, but that he had declined both offers.

Livermore has said little publicly about his time in Downing Street, although he gave an interview to Steve Richards on BBC Radio 4 in September 2010, setting out the events leading up to the 'non-election' of 2007. He has also written on political strategy for the Guardian newspaper.

After Saatchi & Saatchi, Livermore became Director of Strategy at communications consultancy Teneo Blue Rubicon. He set up and had Board responsibility for the agency's Strategic Consulting division, developing insight-based communication strategies for multinational companies.

In 2012, he set up Thirty Six Strategy, advising clients on their corporate and brand positioning.

In 2014 Livermore briefly returned to the political arena when he was appointed the Labour Party's General Election Campaign Director for its unsuccessful 2015 general election. In November 2015 he gave an interview on BBC Radio 4's The World at One, setting out why Labour lost that election.

Personal life 
Baron Livermore is married to Seb Dance, Deputy Mayor of London for Transport, and former MEP for London. They live in Rotherhithe.

References

1975 births
Living people
Alumni of the London School of Economics
People from Slough
British special advisers
Gay politicians
LGBT life peers
Life peers created by Elizabeth II
Labour Party (UK) life peers
Labour Party (UK) officials
English LGBT politicians
People from Wickford
Labour Friends of Israel